College Hockey Mid-America (CHMA) is an American Collegiate Hockey Association Division I ice hockey conference with teams in Ohio, Western Pennsylvania, and West Virginia. The league was formed in 2006 after members of the now defunct University Hockey League organized the league and moved from the ACHA's Division II to Division I.

Season format
The conference formed in 2006 after members of the now defunct University Hockey League organized the league and moved from the ACHA's Division II to Division I. With eight members, each CHMA team plays every other team in a home and away series, producing a regular season of 14 games. Prior to the 2018-19 season, the regular season champion received an automatic bid to the ACHA Division I National Tournament. Starting with the 2019 National Tournament, the CHMA awarded the playoff champion the conference's automatic bid. In 2010, season champion Slippery Rock declined their bid to the national tournament. In 2012, the conference experienced expansion when Mercyhurst and Robert Morris joined. In 2020, Slippery Rock suspended their ACHA Men's Division 1 team. At the same time, the conference added Kent State, who began conference play in the 2021-22 season. The University of Pittsburgh left the conference for the Eastern States Collegiate Hockey League beginning with the 2022-23 season.

Membership
Of the seven member schools, four compete at the Division I level of NCAA, two at Division II (all within the Pennsylvania State Athletic Conference), and one at Division III.

Mercyhurst and Robert Morris joined in 2012. Kent State joined in 2021. 
Note: Mercyhurst and Robert Morris have NCAA Division I hockey teams competing in Atlantic Hockey.

Conference arenas

Former members
University of Pittsburgh moved to Eastern States Collegiate Hockey League
Washington & Jefferson College moved to ACHA Division III
Youngstown State University moved to ACHA Division II
Slippery Rock University dropped ACHA Division I

Past Champions

Robert Morris completed a shortened 2020-21 season of five games due to the COVID-19 pandemic. The Colonials defeated the West Virginia Mountaineers in a three-team CHMA Tournament in March 2021.

National Tournament results
Since the 2007–08 season, the conference's regular season champion received an automatic bid to the Division I national tournament. Starting with the 2018-19 season, the conference's playoff champion received an automatic bid to the Division I national tournament. In the conference's first season in 2006–07, West Virginia earned a spot in the tournament based on their national ranking, winning neither the regular season nor the conference tournament. Washington & Jefferson College also earned a berth to the 2006-07 ACHA Division I National Tournament having won the CHMA regular season title and ranking 14th overall. In the 2021-2022 season, the conference saw two teams represented for the third time in sixteen seasons.

2023: #18 Indiana (PA) will face #15 Illinois State on Thursday, March 16th, at 4:45 PM EDT.
2022: #13 Pittsburgh defeated #20 Navy in first round; was defeated by #4 Nevada-Las Vegas / #20 John Carroll defeated in first round by #14 Maryville.
2021: #2 Robert Morris defeated #15 Davenport in first round; was defeated in second round by #7 Indiana Tech.
2020: #19 Indiana (PA) was scheduled to play #14 Drexel in the first round. The game, as well as the entire 2020 National Tournament, was canceled on March 12, 2020 due to public health concerns related to the novel coronavirus, or COVID-19.
2019: #20 Robert Morris defeated in first round by #13 UNLV.
2018: #18 Pittsburgh defeated in first round by #15 Stony Brook.
2017: #19 Pittsburgh defeated in first round by #14 Oklahoma.
2016: #19 Mercyhurst defeated in first round by #14 Delaware.
2015: #18 Robert Morris defeated in first round by #15 Niagara / #20 John Carroll (HOST) defeated in first round by #13 Illinois.
2014: #20 West Virginia defeated in first round by #13 Navy.
2013: #20 John Carroll defeated in first round by #13 Liberty.
2012: #17 West Virginia defeated #16 Rutgers in first round; was defeated in second round by #1 Penn State.
2011: #16 Slippery Rock defeated in first round by #1 Lindenwood; won 15th-place consolation game against #15 Rutgers.
2010: Slippery Rock declined invitation; was not replaced by another conference team.
2009: #15 Duquesne defeated in first round by #2 Penn State.
2008: #14 West Virginia defeated in first round by #3 Penn State.
2007: #13 West Virginia defeated in first round by #4 Rhode Island; won 13th-place consolation game against #9 Kent State / #14 Washington & Jefferson defeated in first round by #3 Illinois; lost 15th place consolation game against #16 Robert Morris (PA).

See also
 American Collegiate Hockey Association
 List of ice hockey leagues

References

External links
 
 

ACHA Division 1 conferences
2006 establishments in the United States
Sports leagues established in 2006